Crest of the Wave may refer to:

Crest of the Wave (musical), a 1937 musical.
Crest of the Wave (film), the American title of the 1954 British film Seagulls Over Sorrento.